William Alexander, 1st Earl of Stirling (c. 1567 in Menstrie, Clackmannanshire12 February 1640) was a Scottish courtier and poet who was involved in the Scottish colonisation of Charles Fort, later Port-Royal, Nova Scotia in 1629 and Long Island, New York. His literary works include Aurora (1604), The Monarchick Tragedies (1604) and Doomes-Day (1614, 1637).

Biography

Early life
William Alexander was the son of Alexander of Menstrie and Marion, daughter of an Allan Couttie. He was born at Menstrie Castle, near Stirling. The family was old and claimed to be descended from Somerled, Lord of the Isles, through John of Islay. Because his father died in 1580, and William was entrusted to the care of his great-uncle James in Stirling, he was probably educated at Stirling grammar school. There is a tradition that he was at the University of Glasgow; and, according to his friend the poet William Drummond of Hawthornden, he was a student at Leiden University.

As a young man, William became tutor to the Earl of Argyll and accompanied him on his travels in France, Spain and Italy. William married, before 1604, Janet, daughter of Sir William Erskine "The Parson of Campsie", one of the Balgonie family. 

Introduced by Argyll to the court of King James VI in Edinburgh he was one of the senior aristocrats who moved to London with the king in 1603 when he became King of England. He received the place of Gentleman Usher to Prince Charles, son of James I of England (James VI of Scotland), in 1603, and continued in favour at court after Prince Charles became Charles I of England in 1625. In 1607 his father-in-law received a pension of £200 a year to be shared with William, and half the pension continued after Erskine's death.

William built a reputation as a poet and writer of rhymed tragedies, and assisted King James I and VI in preparing the metrical version known as "The Psalms of King David, translated by King James" and published by authority of Charles I. James knighted him in 1609 and appointed him the Master of Requests for Scotland in 1614, effectively his private secretary. In 1613 he began a correspondence with the poet William Drummond of Hawthornden, which ripened into a lifelong intimacy after their 1614 meeting at Menstrie Castle, where Alexander was on one of his short annual visits. In 1615 he was made a member of the Scottish Privy Council. Alexander was an active freemason, belonging to Mary's Chapel Lodge, Edinburgh, from July 1634.

Nova Scotia

In 1621, King James I granted Stirling a royal charter appointing him mayor of a vast territory which was enlarged into a lordship and barony of Nova Scotia (meaning New Scotland); the area is now known as Nova Scotia, New Brunswick, and parts of the northern United States. The creation of Baronets of Nova Scotia was used to settle the plantation of the new province, which was later increased (at least on paper) to include much of Canada.

Stirling was appointed as Secretary of State for Scotland in 1626 and held that office for the rest of his life.

Lord Stirling's efforts at colonisation were less successful, at least in monetary terms, as his recruitment efforts made unrealistic promises about the new territory and were offered on meager terms. He briefly established a Scottish settlement at Charles Fort, later Port-Royal, Nova Scotia, led by his son William Alexander (the younger). However the effort cost him most of his fortune, and when the region—now Canada's three Maritime Provinces and the state of Maine—was returned to France in 1632, it was lost.  He was unable to obtain from the
treasury, in spite of royal support, £6,000 as compensation for his losses. He spent his later years with limited means. However Alexander's settlement provided the basis for Scottish claims to Nova Scotia, and his baronets provided the Coat of arms of Nova Scotia and Flag of Nova Scotia which are still in use today.

Long Island
In 1630, King Charles rewarded his service by creating him Lord Alexander of Tullibody and Viscount of Stirling. Three years later, when Charles was crowned in Holyrood, in 1633 he became Earl of Stirling and Viscount Canada, and in 1639 Earl of Dovan.

On 22 April 1636, Charles told the Plymouth Colony, which had laid claim to Long Island but had not settled it, to give the island to Alexander.  Through his agent James Farret (who personally received Shelter Island and Robins Island), Alexander in turn sold most of the eastern island to the New Haven Colony and Connecticut Colony.

Farret arrived in New Amsterdam in 1637 to present his claim of English sovereignty but was arrested and sent to prison in Holland where he escaped.  English colonists attempted to settle at Cow Bay at what today is Port Washington, New York in 1640, but after an alert by Native leader Penhawitz were arrested by the Dutch and released after saying they were mistaken about the title. After 1640, eastern Long Island was quickly settled by the English while the western portion remained under Dutch rule until 1674.

Death and succession

Alexander died in London on 12 February 1640 and was succeeded by his grandson William Alexander, 2nd Earl of Stirling (c. 1632- May 1640), a child who himself died the same year. The 3rd Earl, Henry Alexander (died 1650), was the second son of William Alexander, the 1st Earl.

Literary works
Alexander was one of the most highly regarded Scottish poets in early seventeenth-century Scotland and England: he was praised by William Drummond of Hawthornden, Arthur Johnstone, Andrew Ramsey, Michael Drayton, Samuel Daniel and John Davies of Hereford. Alexander's earliest work was probably Aurora (London, 1604), which was described on its title-page as 'the first fancies of the author's youth' and is a late addition to the corpus of Elizabethan Petrarchan sonnets. His closet dramas - Croesus, Darius, The Alexandrean, and Julius Caesar - were published together as The Monarchick Tragedies (London, 1604; further editions in 1607, 1616, 1637). According to Daniel Cadman, in these plays Alexander 'interrogates the value of republican forms of government and provides a voice for the frustrations of politically marginalised subjects of absolutist regimes'.

Alexander's grandest work is an epic poem describing the end of the world, Doomes-day. It was first published in four books (Edinburgh, 1614), and later in twelve (in the collected edition of Alexander's work printed in London, 1637). The poem, which contains almost 1,400 eight-line stanzas in total, begins with a synopsis of world history in the First 'Hour', then provides long catalogues of the creatures, battle dead, pagans, monarchs, sinners, biblical characters and, finally, members of the heavenly host who will appear at the Final Judgement. Alexander's method was indebted to the French Protestant poet Guillaume de Salluste Du Bartas; Drummond acknowledged the kinship in the title of a manuscript poem Sur les oeuvres poetiques de Guillaume Alexandre, Sieur De Menstre.

Alexander collaborated with James VI and I on a new paraphrase of the Psalms, composed a continuation to Philip Sidney's Arcadia that links the end of Book 3 in Sidney's incomplete revised version to the ending in the 1593 text, and also wrote down his thoughts on poetry in Anacrisis: Or a Censure of some Poets Ancient and Modern (c. 1635). Anacrisis begins with a reflection on the pleasure of literature:

After a great Travel both of Body and of Mind, which (since not voluntary but imposed upon me) was the more painful, by retiring for a Time where I was born [...] being curious, as the most dainty Kind of Pleasure for such as are capable of their Delicacies to recreate myself with the Muses,—I may justly say recreate, since they create new Spirits [...] I conversed with some of the Modern as well as with the Ancients, kindling my Fire at those Fires which do still burn out of the Ashes of ancient Authors

This passage testifies to the value that Alexander placed on his literary pursuits (which mostly took place at his Menstrie estate) as an activity that was separate from but complementary to his public life as a politician and coloniser. Indeed, the phrase 'recreate myself with the Muses' re-appeared in the title of the collected edition of his works, Recreations with the Muses (1637).

Legacy
The Canadian Coast Guard has named the CCGS Sir William Alexander in his honour.

References

Further reading
 The Poetical Works of Sir William Alexander, Earl of Stirling, ed. by L.E. Kastner and H.B. Charlton, 2 vols (Edinburgh: Printed for the Scottish Text Society, 1921‒29)
 David W. Atkinson, 'More than One Voice; The Poetic Accomplishment of William Alexander', in Older Scots Literature, ed. by Sally Mapstone (Edinburgh: John Donald, 2005), pp. 584‒94
 
 
 
 Thomas McGrail, Sir William Alexander, First Earl of Stirling: A Biographical Study (Edinburgh: Oliver and Boyd, 1940)
 Nigel Tranter, Poetic Justice, London: Hodder & Stoughton, 1996. A well-researched & lively retelling of the life of William Alexander, 1st Earl of Stirling.

External links 
Photographs of Halifax monument

|-

|-

1560s births
1640 deaths
Earls in the Peerage of Scotland
Peers of Scotland created by Charles I
People from Clackmannanshire
Pre-Confederation Nova Scotia people
Scottish businesspeople
Scottish Freemasons
Scottish explorers
Scottish knights
Scottish scholars and academics
Alumni of the University of Glasgow
Castalian Band
Governors of Acadia
Members of the Privy Council of Scotland
16th-century Scottish people
17th-century Scottish writers
17th-century Scottish dramatists and playwrights
17th-century Scottish poets
Scottish dramatists and playwrights
Members of the Convention of the Estates of Scotland 1625
Members of the Convention of the Estates of Scotland 1630
William